Visitacion Parado (born July 2, 1961), better known by her screen name Tetchie Agbayani, is a Filipino movie and television actress, Mutya ng Pilipinas, psychology instructor and Playboy model. She appeared in a regular issue of German Playboy and a special American edition entitled "Women of the World". She is featured daily on several Filipino TV channels, where she stars in soap operas.

Early life
Agbayani was born on July 2, 1961 to a Roman Catholic family. She studied high school at the University of Santo Tomas before enrolling in the University's Bachelor of Science in Architecture program in 1979. She eventually dropped from the program due to showbiz commitments.

Hollywood
In the United States, Agbayani pursued acting in Hollywood. She appeared in international productions, sometimes credited as Carol Roberts. Her films include John Boorman's The Emerald Forest (1985); a cameo in The Money Pit (1986); leading lady in Gymkata (1985); and as a geologist in the Australian film Rikky and Pete (1988). Agbayani also appeared in an episode of the British television series Yellowthread Street.

On television, she played the tragic heroine "Sisa" in Eddie Romero's Noli Me Tangere, based on the novel by Philippine national hero Dr. José Rizal.

Private life
In 1989, Agbayani returned to the Philippines and took time out from her career to give birth to her daughter, China. During this period, Agbayani devoted her whole time as a mother, living a private life for several years.

Education
In 1995, Agbayani resumed her education and enrolled in Saint Joseph's College, Quezon City. She graduated with a Bachelor of Science in psychology in 2000. In 2001, she was accepted into the Master of Arts in psychology with a concentration in counseling psychology program at the Ateneo de Manila University. She completed all academic requirements and is now working on her master's thesis. She is also teaching psychology at Saint Joseph's, while doing occasional TV and film appearances.

Filmography

Film

Television

Awards and nominations

References

External links

1961 births
Ateneo de Manila University alumni
Filipino educators
Filipino psychologists
Filipino women psychologists
Filipino female models
Living people
Filipino film actresses
Filipino television actresses
Mutya ng Pilipinas winners